Jacob Osei Yeboah is a politician who contested as an independent candidate for Ghana's presidential elections in 2012 and 2016. Out of seventeen candidates,  Yeboah and three others survived the Electoral Commission's controversial disqualification of candidates ahead of the 2016 general elections. He is an old student of Opoku Ware School (Santasi-Kumasi) and had his first degree in Electrical/Electronic Engineering from Kwame Nkrumah University of Science and Technology in 1994. Yeboah began his graduate National Service at Ashanti Goldfields Company (AGC) in Obuasi and was later employed in October, 1995. Jacob became board member representing the senior staff in October 1996, to the surprise of many. He progressed through the ranks, from Instrumentation Engineer to Instrumentation Superintendent, at the Pompora Treatment Plant (PTP) within three years. Jacob was later appointed as Projects Coordinator in the year 2000. He served the AGC Obuasi board for two terms over six years. Yeboah joined Sherwood International, a member of Supergroup Company in South Africa, as the W/Africa Manager for mining companies developing the Supply Chain Management.

References 

4. https://www.businessghana.com/site/news/sports/97437/legal JOY launches a book

5. http://www.otmediaonline.com/full-speech-of-jacob-osei-yeboah-at-the-2nd-motion-of-destiny/ Ghana's 2nd Motion of Destiny moved by JOY.

Living people
Candidates for President of Ghana
Year of birth missing (living people)
Alumni of Opoku Ware School